Zelimkhan Yaqub (21 January 1950 – 9 January 2016) was an Azerbaijani poet. He served as a deputy of the National Assembly of Azerbaijan from 1995 to 2005. He was also named the national poet of Azerbaijan in 2005.

Life 
Zelimkhan Yaqub was born on January 21, 1950, in Bolnisi Municipality, Georgian SSR, Soviet Union.

He graduated from high school in the village where he was born in 1967, and in 1972 from the library faculty of the Azerbaijan State University.

From 1973 to 1978 in the "Azerkitab" system, in the bookstore "Book Passage" salesman, chief salesman, department head, from 1975 to 1985 editor, department head in the propaganda department of the Azerbaijan Voluntary Book Lovers Society, from 1987 to 1994 he worked as an editor and head of the poetry department at the Yazichi publishing house.

In 1995–2005 he was a deputy of the Milli Majlis of the Republic of Azerbaijan.

His first poem was published on October 4, 1966, in the "Flag of Victory" newspaper of the Bolnisi district of the Georgian SSR.

He has been a member of the Union of Azerbaijani Writers since 1983.

On August 29, 2008, at the V Congress of Azerbaijani Ashugs, he was elected chairman of the Azerbaijan Ashugs Union.

He has been a member of the Pardon Commission under the President of the Republic of Azerbaijan since 1994.

From 1995 to 2000, he visited China, Saudi Arabia, Germany, the United States, Sweden, Switzerland, Kyrgyzstan, Turkey, France and Iraq as part of the official delegation.

Zalimkhan Yagub has been suffering from kidney failure for a long time. He underwent treatment in countries such as Turkey and Germany. The public figure, in the last years of his life, who did not have both kidneys, lived on dialysis. He passed away on January 9, 2016.

Awards 
Mammad Araz Literary Prize (1995), H.Z. Tagiyev Prize for the book "Poet's Call", "Wounds of the Motherland", "I do not condemn you" and "Let your visit be accepted" (1995), the Shohrat Order and the Order of Honor of the Republic of Georgia was awarded with.

In 2005, he was awarded the honorary title of "People's Poet of Azerbaijan".

On October 5, 2012, the New York Association of Azerbaijan, which operates in the United States, awarded the People's Poet with an Honorary Diploma and a Medal.

People's Poet of Azerbaijan Zalimkhan Yagub was awarded the International Nazim Hikmet Poetry Award for his outstanding services to Turkish literature by the decision of the International Award Committee of the International Academy of Turkic World Studies in Ankara on February 7, 2014. Zalimkhan Yagub is the first Azerbaijani to receive this award, which is awarded every two years to one of the writers of the Turkic world.

Honorary membership 
On June 6, 2009, he was awarded the "Service to the Turkic World" award of the International Academy of Turkic World Studies and was elected an honorary doctor of the academy.

In 2010, Zalimkhan Yagub was awarded the title of Honorary Doctor of the Georgian-Azerbaijani University of Education named after Heydar Aliyev for his special services in the poetic coverage of the Georgian-Azerbaijani friendship.

Books written about 
Poet-publicist Ali Rza Khalafli wrote a book "Song of Immortality" ("Vatan" publishing house, 2013) about the poem "Epic of Eternity" dedicated to Zalimkhan Yagub to prominent statesman Heydar Aliyev and published it in an elegant design.

In 2016, the book "Eternal Prometheus" by People's Poet Khalil Rza Uluturk was published. The book was prepared for publication by Honored Cultural Worker Musa Nabioglu and was published by "Science and Education" publishing house. In the book, Zalimkhan Yagub is called "Eternal Prometheus, Eternal Samander Bird", who considers him "the head of our poetry, poetry, the Azerbaijani people", and 30 years ago "Zalimkhan is the only poet who does not need any propaganda in Azerbaijan," said KhRuluturk. Zalimkhan Yagub's articles dedicated to his work and notes about him in his diary were collected.

Books 

 Şair harayı
 Vətən yaralar
 Sizi qınamıram
 Ziyarətin qəbul olsun
 Od aldığım ocaqlar 1986
 Mən sənin qəlbinə necə yol tapım 2003
 Böyük ömrün dastanı 2004
 Qayıdaq əvvəlki xatirələrə 2004
 Gözlərimin nurudu doğulduğum bu torpaq 2005
 Mən bir dağ çayıyam 2006
 Əbədiyyət dastanı 2008
 Сказы саза 2008
 Peyğəmbər (poema) 2009
 Özün basdırdığın ağaca söykən (I cild). Bakı. "Şərq-Qərb", 2010, 284 səh. şəkilli
 Özün basdırdığın ağaca söykən (II cild). Bakı. "Şərq-Qərb", 2010,
 Mövlana. Bakı: "Vətən", 2012. — 194 səh.
 Seçilmiş əsərləri,
 Məni sabahıma qovuşdur, ana. Bakı. "Elm və təhsil", 2015,
 Seçilmiş əsərləri. 2020 ("Xalq əmanəti" layihəsi çərçivəsində)

References

1950 births
2016 deaths
Azerbaijani poets
Members of the National Assembly (Azerbaijan)
Georgian Azerbaijanis